"Outta My System" is a song by American rapper Bow Wow. It's the second and final single off his fifth studio album The Price of Fame. It features rapper T-Pain and singer Johntá Austin. The original next single was supposed to be "I'm a Flirt" but was cancelled in favor of "Outta My System", that the fact that R. Kelly was preoccupied on the charts with Snoop Dogg's "That's That Shit" and Young Jeezy's "Go Getta" led to it being delayed. The song peaked at number 22 on the Billboard Hot 100, his eighth top 40 hit and T-Pain's sixth top 40 hit on that chart. It also peaked at number 2 and 12 on the Hot Rap Songs and Hot R&B/Hip-Hop Songs charts respectively and number 7 in New Zealand. The video premiered on Valentine's Day on BET's Access Granted.

The song was written by Jaron Alston (an in-house ghostwriter for So So Def Recordings, known then as "Kid Slim") and Jermaine Dupri, with a sample credit from Rick James (from the song "Hollywood"). It was produced by Dupri along with No I.D.

Song and video information
In this song, Bow Wow is thought to be addressing his breakup with Ciara, his former girlfriend. This was confirmed by Bow Wow himself when he mentioned her name during a performance of the song on 106 & Park in late December 2006. This song is thought to be a song about their break-up, in which was rumored to be a result of Bow Wow's sexual relations with one of Ciara's friend's Ashley R. (a video girl who appeared in the show College Hill: Atlanta). This song's video hit number 1 on "106 and Park" in just 7 days but after it went down to number 8 and then fell off the countdown, unlike his previous video "Shortie Like Mine" which went to number 1 and stayed on the countdown for 43+ days shortly after.
The song uses a sample of Rick James' "Hollywood".

Commercial performance
"Outta My System" debuted at number 76 on the Billboard Hot 100 the week of March 10, 2007. Ten weeks later, it peaked at number 22 the week of May 26, 2007. It stayed on the chart for twenty weeks.

Charts and certifications

Weekly charts

Year-end charts

Certifications

References

2006 songs
2006 singles
2007 singles
Bow Wow (rapper) songs
T-Pain songs
Music videos directed by Bryan Barber
Song recordings produced by Jermaine Dupri
Songs written by Jermaine Dupri
Songs written by Rick James